Albizzate is a town and comune located in the province of Varese, in the Lombardy region of northern Italy.

It is served by Albizzate-Solbiate Arno railway station.

Origins of the name
Coming from the Latin name of Arvidius (from Arvius), followed by the suffix -ate. Less likely, the name is believed to be connected to the presence of a castle that belonged to the family Albizzi.

Notable people
 Stefano Chiodaroli (1964), actor
 Lucia Bosetti (1989), volleyball player

References

Cities and towns in Lombardy